Sadma is a 1983 Indian Hindi-language romantic drama film, written and directed by Balu Mahendra. It stars Kamal Haasan and Sridevi in lead roles, with the music composed by Ilaiyaraaja. The film tells the story of Nehalata Malhotra, a young woman who regresses to childhood as result of retrograde amnesia after suffering a head injury in a car crash. She was lost, and ended up trapped in a brothel before being rescued by Somu, a lonely school teacher who falls in love with her. The film was released on 8 July 1983.

The film was a remake of Mahendra's own 1982 Tamil film Moondram Pirai, which also starred Kamal and Sridevi. Sadma was widely acclaimed by critics for its direction, screenplay, music and performances. Sridevi's performance as an amnesiac woman was widely praised. Although a commercial failure upon release, Sadma over the years has gained cult status.

At the 31st Filmfare Awards, Sadma received three nominations: Best Actor (Kamal Haasan) Best Actress (Sridevi) and Best Story (Mahendra).

Plot
Nehalata, a young woman, has a car accident while returning from a party and is hospitalized with severe head injuries. When she recovers, she is diagnosed with retrograde amnesia. Having mentally regressed to the state of her 6-year-old self, she fails to recognize her elderly parents. While she is undergoing treatment, she is kidnapped and sold to the madam of a brothel.
Somprakash, also known as Somu, visits the brothel with his old friend to relax. The madam sends Nehalata, renamed Reshmi, to his room. Somu realises that she is mentally a child and pities her upon learning how she came to the brothel. He questions her about her family and background, but due to her condition she is unable to reveal enough information for him to locate her parents.

Somu rescues Reshmi from the brothel, under the pretense of a pleasure trip. He takes her to his home in Ooty, where he works as a school teacher. His elderly neighbour, whom he refers to as Grandmother, helps him care for Reshmi. Although Somu is aware of Reshmi's physical beauty, their relationship is strictly that of a child and protective caregiver and she becomes trusting of him. Their bond is briefly threatened when Reshmi accidentally spills ink over Somu's documents, angering him, but they reconcile. Later, a local woodcutter named Balua lusts for Reshmi and nearly assaults her, but she manages to save herself. When Somu learns of it, he becomes livid with rage and almost kills Balua. In a side plot Soni, the lonely younger wife of Somu's middle-aged headmaster, repeatedly attempts and fails to seduce Somu, who does not reciprocate her feelings.

Reshmi's father, who was searching for her through the police, releases a newspaper advertisement about her. He is given a lead by a co-passenger of the train that Somu and Reshmi had taken to Ooty. Meanwhile, Somu takes Reshmi to a medicine man and leaves her with him for a day's treatment. The police arrive at Somu's house searching for Reshmi, eventually tracing her to the medicine man's home. Somu, fearing police action, does not follow them there. The treatment is successful, with Reshmi (now Nehalata again) regaining her memory, recognizing her parents and completely forgetting the period between her accident and recovery. She and her parents rejoice and prepare to leave Ooty. The medicine man informs her father that the man who had brought her to him had been taking good care of his daughter; her father withdraws his police complaint and the family begin their journey home.

After the police leave, Somu chases the car in which Nehalata is traveling, falling and severely injuring himself in the process. Covered in mud, he limps after them to the railway station and tries to get Reshmi's attention at her train seat window, but she does not remember him. Somu repeatedly calls out to her and mimics a dancing monkey that she had developed a liking for but Nehalata, unable to comprehend, thinks he is insane and begging for food. He continues his futile attempts, but the train eventually leaves with Nehalata not recognising him. Somu is left alone at the station, heartbroken.

Cast
 Kamal Haasan as Somprakash "Somu"
 Sridevi as Nehalata Malhotra / Reshmi
 Gulshan Grover as Balua
 Silk Smitha as Soni
 Paintal as Paintal
 Arvind Deshpande as J.K. Malhotra
 Ashalata Wabgaonkar  as Rajeshwari Malhotra
 Shreeram Lagoo as Dr. Khandeparkar
 Viju Khote as Inspector David
 Birbal as Shyamu
 Leela Mishra as Somu's Neighbour
 Padma Chavan as Brothel Madam

Soundtrack

The music was composed by Ilaiyaraaja, in his Bollywood debut, and the lyrics were penned by Gulzar.Ilaiyaraaja retained two of his compositions from the original Tamil version. The song "Vaanengum Thanga Vinmeengal" was tuned differently for the Hindi version as "Yeh Hawa Yeh Fiza". The song "Narikkathai" was replaced with the song "Ek Dafa Ek Jungle Tha" in the Hindi version. The cult song "Poongatru Puthithanathu" was replaced with slightly different "Ae Zindagi Gale Laga Le" which itself went on to become a cult song in Hindi after which it was used in 1984 Tamil movie Thambikku Entha Ooru sung by SPB. "Ae Zindagi Gale Laga Le" was first remade for the film Prague (2013) by Atif Afzal. It was again remade for the film Dear Zindagi (2016) by Amit Trivedi. Music director A. R. Rahman worked as a keyboard player for this film.

Release 
Sadma was released on 8 July 1983. In 2015, Sadma was screened at the Habitat Film Festival.

Critical reception
Sadma received widespread critical acclaim with major appreciation drawn towards Sridevi's performance. It is included in iDiva's list of '10 Must Watch Movies That Weren't Blockbusters'. Sridevi's performance as a child-woman suffering from amnesia was called by Indian Express "a milestone in her illustrious career". Sridevi also featured in the Mid-Day list of 'Challenging Roles played by Bollywood Actors' describing her act in the film as "her best performance ever". In 2012, when Barfi! was being promoted, Anurag Basu said "People might feel so because the last film that featured the actress in a mentally challenged role was of Sadma. But the comparisons are only on the basis of the promo...once you see the film upon its release everything would be clear.". That same year, Adil Hussain, Sridevi's co-star in English Vinglish revealed that he became a fan of the actress after watching her in Sadma. The Sridevi-Kamal Haasan pair also appeared on the CNN-IBN list of 'Greatest Romantic Couples on Celluloid'. The climax of Sadma is included in the CNN-IBN list of 'Bollywood's 50 Most Memorable Scenes of All Time'.

Awards and nominations

31st Filmfare Awards 
Nominated
 Best Actor – Kamal Haasan
 Best Actress – Sridevi
Best Story – Balu Mahendra

References

External links
 
 

1980s Hindi-language films
1983 films
Hindi remakes of Tamil films
Films directed by Balu Mahendra
Films shot in Ooty
Films scored by Ilaiyaraaja
Films about amnesia